Trichodes is a genus of checkered beetle belonging to the family Cleridae, subfamily Clerinae.

Species
These 64 species belong to the genus Trichodes:

 Trichodes affinis Chevrolat, 1843
 Trichodes albanicus Winkler & Zirovnicky, 1980 g
 Trichodes alberi Escherich, 1894 g
 Trichodes alvearius (Fabricius, 1792) g
 Trichodes ammios (Fabricius, 1787) g
 Trichodes apiarius (Linnaeus, 1758)- Bee Beetle
 Trichodes apivorus Germar
 Trichodes aulicus Klug g
 Trichodes axillaris Fischer, 1842
 Trichodes bibalteatus LeConte, 1858 i c g b
 Trichodes bicinctus Green, 1917 i c g b
 Trichodes bimaculatus LeConte, 1874 i c g
 Trichodes calamistratus Corporaal g
 Trichodes crabroniformis (Fabricius, 1787) g
 Trichodes creticus Brodsky, 1982 g
 Trichodes cyprius Reitter, 1893 g
 Trichodes dilatipennis Reitter, 1894 g
 Trichodes ephippiger Chevrolat, 1874 g
 Trichodes favarius (Illiger, 1802) g
 Trichodes flavocinctus Spinola, 1844 g
 Trichodes ganglbaueri Escherich, 1893 g
 Trichodes graecus Winkler & Zirovnicky, 1980 g
 Trichodes heydeni Escherich, 1892 g
 Trichodes inermis Reitter, 1894 g
 Trichodes insignis Fischer von Waldheim, 1829 g
 Trichodes ircutensis (Laxmann, 1770)
 Trichodes jelineki Brodsky & Winkler, 1988 g
 Trichodes laminatus Chevrolat, 1843 g
 Trichodes lepidus Walker g
 Trichodes leucopsideus (Olivier, 1795) g
 Trichodes longicollis Gerstmeier, 1985 g
 Trichodes longissimus (Abeille, 1881) g
 Trichodes martini Fairmaire g
 Trichodes nobilis Klug, 1842 g
 Trichodes nuttalli (Kirby, 1818) i c g b (red-blue checkered beetle)
 Trichodes oberthueri Chanipenois, 1900
 Trichodes octopunctatus (Fabricius, 1787) g
 Trichodes olivieri (Chevrolat, 1843) g
 Trichodes oregonensis Barr, 1952 i c g
 Trichodes oresterus Wolcott, 1910 i c g b
 Trichodes ornatus Say, 1823 i c g b (ornate checkered beetle)
 Trichodes penicillatus Schenkling g
 Trichodes peninsularis Horn, 1894 i c g b
 Trichodes persicus Kraatz, 1894 g
 Trichodes pseudaulicus Corporaal g
 Trichodes pulcherrimus Escherich, 1892 g
 Trichodes punctatus Fischer von Waldheim, 1829 g
 Trichodes quadriguttatus Adams, 1817 g
 Trichodes rectilinea Reitter, 1894 g
 Trichodes reichei Mulsant & Rey, 1863 g
 Trichodes sexpustulatus Chevrolat, 1874 g
 Trichodes similis Kraatz, 1894 g
 Trichodes simulator Horn, 1880 i c g b
 Trichodes sipylus (Linnaeus, 1758) g
 Trichodes suspectus Escherich, 1892 g
 Trichodes suturalis Seidlitz, 1891 g
 Trichodes syriacus Spinola, 1844
 Trichodes talyshensis Zaitzev, 1915 g
 Trichodes tugelanus Gorham g
 Trichodes turkestanicus Kraatz, 1882 g
 Trichodes umbellatarum (Olivier, 1795) g
 Trichodes winkleri Zirovnicky, 1976 g
 Trichodes zaharae Chevrolat, 1861 g
 Trichodes zebra Faldermann, 1835 g

Data sources: i = ITIS, c = Catalogue of Life, g = GBIF, b = Bugguide.net

References

External links
 Biolib

 
Cleridae genera
Beetles of Europe